Karameli Tiffany Faaee (born November 14, 1982) is an American rugby union player. She captained the US Eagles to the 2017 Women's Rugby World Cup in Ireland. She competed at the 2017 Can-Am Series.

Faaee has represented Samoa and New Zealand in rugby league. She played most of her rugby in New Zealand. She moved to the United States in 2013.

In 2018, Faeaee signed as an assistant coach of Rugby United New York, a Major League Rugby expansion team.

References

External links 
 USA Rugby Profile

1982 births
American female rugby union players
Living people
New Zealand female rugby league players
New Zealand women's national rugby league team players
Rugby New York coaches
Samoa women's national rugby league team players
United States women's international rugby union players
21st-century American women